The men's 4 × 440 yards relay event at the 1966 British Empire and Commonwealth Games was held on 13 August at the Independence Park in Kingston, Jamaica. It was the last time that the imperial distance was contested at the Games later replaced by the 4 × 400 metres relay.

Medalists

Results

Heats

Qualification: First 4 teams of each heat (Q) qualified directly for the final.

Final

References

Athletics at the 1966 British Empire and Commonwealth Games
1966